Antonín Ettrich was a Czechoslovakian cross-country skier who competed in the 1920s. He won a bronze medal at the 1925 FIS Nordic World Ski Championships in the 50 km event.

External links

Czech male cross-country skiers
Czechoslovak male cross-country skiers
FIS Nordic World Ski Championships medalists in cross-country skiing
Year of birth missing
Year of death missing